NTS Motorsports was an American professional stock car racing team that competed in the NASCAR Camping World Truck Series. The team was owned by Californian Bob Newberry, coming into its current form after Joe Denette Motorsports merged with Newberry's NTS team, both of which originally had support from Kevin Harvick. The team's final race was at Daytona in 2016.

History

Joe Denette Motorsports
After Thornburg, Virginia native Joe Denette was laid off from his job in 2009, he entered the lottery, buying a "fistfull" of Mega Millions tickets with the initial dream of buying an RV to travel to races each week. Denette matched six numbers in a May 1 drawing and won $75.6 million, taking a lump sum payment of $46 million. With the money, Denette contacted fellow Virginian and former full-time driver Hermie Sadler about starting his own team in the Camping World Truck Series. After consulting with then team owner Kevin Harvick of KHI, Denette founded his own team in 2011, with trucks and support from KHI and engines from Pro Motor Engines. Denette hired another Virginian, Jason White, who brought sponsorship from GunBroker.com. Coincidentally, Denette bought 23 lottery tickets for his big pay day, and White's sponsor carried the number 23. Hermie's brother and Harvick's Nationwide Series driver Elliott Sadler drove a second truck, the No. 24, for a few races near the end of the season. The team endured some growing pains in 2011; though they scored seven top tens and a pole with Sadler at Bristol, White finished 15th in points. The team fielded both trucks full-time in 2012 with Denette, a long-time Bill Elliott fan, renumbering the 23 truck to No. 9.

NTS Motorsports
Meanwhile, NTS Motorsports was founded by former driver Bob Newberry, also a friend of Kevin Harvick and his father Mike, in Bakersfield, California, fielding cars for son Brennan in the United States Auto Club, K&N Pro Series West, K&N Pro Series East, and the ARCA Racing Series. Mike Harvick served as the younger Newberry's early crew chief. The team ran part-time in the Truck Series with Newberry in 2011 and 2012.

2013–present: merger
In December 2012, JDM merged with NTS, and adopted the latter's name to run the No. 9 truck with Ron Hornaday Jr., the No. 24 truck with Brennan Newberry, and the No. 14 truck with several drivers including Kevin Harvick for the 2013 season. The team moved into Harvick's former KHI facility in Kernersville, NC, with Harvick as an adviser and Bruce Cook as competition director. Hornaday would be released with one race to go in the season.

In 2014, the team expanded to two full-time rides and two part-time rides fielding multiple drivers, including Chase Pistone, Ron Hornaday Jr., Gray Gaulding, Justin Lofton, Austin Dillon, and Brennan Newberry. Dwayne Gaulding was also brought on as the VP of Operations for the team. Newberry was set to run a 12-race truck schedule, while 16-year-old Gaulding competed in 9 races on tracks one mile or shorter. The team also ran two full-time entries in the K&N Pro Series East and a part-time entry in the Nationwide Series with SS-Green Light Racing.

Camping World Truck Series

Truck No. 9 history

The 9 truck was the original entry out of Joe Denette Motorsports. It began as the number 23 truck, with Jason White and sponsor GunBroker.com moving over from SS-Green Light Racing. White scored two top fives and five top tens en route to a 15th-place points finish, and would leave with his sponsor to start their own team. In 2012, four-time series champion Ron Hornaday Jr. would be signed to drive the now-9 truck, moving over from the closed KHI operation of mutual friend Kevin Harvick. Coming off a four win season, Hornaday struggled with the young team, posting two top fives and six top tens against three crashes and five total DNFs to finish 13th in points. It was Hornaday's first season without a win and, at the time, his worst finish in points.

Hornaday returned to the 9 truck for the full season in 2013. After nine top 10 finishes but struggles to find regular sponsorship, the team released Hornaday with one race to go in the season. Hornaday ran Turner Scott Motorsports' 34 truck with his sponsor Smokey Mountain Herbal Snuff at Homestead-Miami, and moved to their 30 truck in 2014. Former KHI driver Nelson Piquet Jr. took over the No. 9 at Homestead.

The 9 truck ran the full season (except the Daytona opener) in 2014. In March, Chase Pistone, grandson of former Sprint Cup Series winner Tom Pistone, was signed to run 14 races in the 9 truck. Pistone ultimately ran five races in the truck, with a best finish of 9th at Gateway. Brennan Newberry ran nine races in the truck, scoring two top tens. Justin Lofton returned to the truck series at Charlotte in the No. 9 truck. Jason White returned to run two races in the truck. In September, it was announced the Ron Hornaday Jr. would return to the 9 truck of NTS with his sponsor Rheem, after being released from Turner Scott Motorsports due to internal issues within the organization. Hornaday drove at Las Vegas and Texas with Rheem, and a third race at Talladega with ARMOUR Foods. Ty Dillon replaced Newberry for the season finale at Homestead, finishing 7th.

Truck No. 14 history

The 14 truck was the original Truck Series effort of Bob Newberry's NTS Motorsports. Son Brennan Newberry attempted the 2011 Truck Series finale at Homestead in the 14 truck, but failed to make the field after qualifying was rained out. Newberry then attempted 12 races in 2012 (withdrawing from Dover and failing to qualify at Martinsville), with 5 crashes and a best finish of 19th. Newberry's driving coach Brandon Miller ran the No. 14 at Texas finishing 20th.

Newberry began the 2013 season in the 14 truck for his rookie season, with Eddie Pardue as crew chief. Newberry won the pole at the season opener at Daytona, but finished 33rd after a crash. After four races, Newberry moved over to the No. 24 truck and the No. 14 scaled back to part-time. Veteran Max Papis drove the 14 at Canadian Tire Motorsports Park with sponsor Sport Clips. Papis would finish sixth on the road course after a last lap incident with Eddie Sharp Racing driver Mike Skeen, leading the two to quarrel on the cool down lap, and leading Skeens girlfriend to slap Papis on camera for which she received a fine and an indefinite suspension from all NASCAR events. Kevin Harvick ran the 14 truck at the second Martinsville race with sponsorship from Anderson's Maple Syrup and Kroger. Harvick would be involved in an incident with then-teammate Ty Dillon, grandson of RCR owner Richard Childress, while racing for second place, knocking the 14 truck out of the race. Harvick would later mention Ty Dillon and his brother Austin as reasons for his impending departure from the organization after 13 seasons.

In 2014, Sprint Cup Series rookie Michael Annett ran the No. 14 truck at Eldora Speedway with TMC Transportation as the sponsor. Austin Dillon ran the second to last race of the season with RUUD Comfort Products.

Daniel Hemric  drove the 14 truck full-time in 2015, running for Rookie of the Year. Hemric would finish 7th in points, but would move to Brad Keselowski Racing for 2016.

Truck No. 20 history
The 20 truck debuted in 2014. Former Daytona winner John King drove the truck at the season opener. Gray Gaulding ran his part-time schedule in the 20 truck with sponsorship from Gemini Southern and Krispy Kreme, scoring two top five finishes. Former series champion Austin Dillon made his debut for the team at Kansas in the No. 20 truck, and ran a total of four races with the team. Justin Lofton won a pole at Texas in the 20, finishing second. He would run two more races with a 9th-place finish at Pocono. Daniel Hemric ran the season finale at Homestead, finishing 12th.

Florida native Scott Lagasse Jr. drove the truck at Daytona in February and Homestead in November with sponsorship from the Florida Department of Transportation. Gaulding planned to return for eight races in 2015, but left prior to his first start at Martinsville for Red Horse Racing.

Truck No. 24 history

The 24 truck debuted in 2011 as the second JDM truck with Elliott Sadler driving, sponsored by AMFM Energy and the Virginia Lottery. Sadler ran three races, scoring a pole at Bristol and two top ten finishes. K&N Pro Series East champion Max Gresham was hired to drive the truck for 2012, but left due to sponsorship issues after eight races and no top-15 finishes. The truck did not run for the rest of the year

Kevin Harvick was signed for two races in 2013 in a third NTS truck. He ran the 24 truck in second race of the season at Martinsville with longtime sponsor Tide, finishing 25th after a tire issue. Harvick and Tide were entered the next week at Rockingham but withdrew. After 4 races, Brennan Newberry and the No. 14 crew switched to number No. 24, in conjunction with new sponsor Qore-24 Hand Sanitizer. Newberry scored a single top ten finish (at Pocono) and had four DNFs, finishing 19th in points.

In 2014, the truck ran a single race at the Daytona season opener with Newberry and GunBroker.com, finishing 25th. The No. 24 truck was replaced by the No. 9 entry for the remainder of the season.

Truck No. 31 history

For 2015, NTS fielded a truck for 2012 series champion James Buescher for the first three races, using number 31. The truck was also run by Scott Lagasse Jr. in two races, Austin Dillon at Eldora, Ty Dillon at Bristol, Travis Pastrana at Las Vegas, and in the two final races of the season by Rico Abreu.

Xfinity Series

Car No. 55/77 history
In 2014, Brennan Newberry ran a part-time Nationwide Series schedule in the No. 55 usually run by Jamie Dick and Viva Motorsports. Bob Newberry was listed as the owner; the car was fielded by SS-Green Light Racing with support from NTS and sponsorship from Qore-24. Newberry finished 25th in his series debut at Loudon, then scored a solid 19th-place finish at Watkins Glen and a 23rd-place finish at Chicago. Newberry and NTS/SS-Green Light ran a fourth race at Newberry's favorite track Phoenix International Raceway in a No. 77 car, finishing 36th after an early crash. In 2015, NTS Motorsports and Rick Ware Racing teamed up to field Lagasse, Jr in the No. 15 Chevrolet Camaro to run at Daytona in July where he qualified well but finished 38th.

K&N Pro Series East

Car No. 20 history
In 2014 Gray Gaulding, a member of NASCAR Next, moved over to NTS to run the full schedule in the K&N Pro Series East in the 20 Krispy Kreme Chevrolet Impala, in addition to a part-time Truck Series schedule. Gaulding would score a pole, four top fives, and nine top tens to finish third in points. Gaulding also ran both Phoenix races in the K&N Pro Series West, scoring a second-place finish in November.

Gaulding returned to the K&N East Series in 2015. After a single race, a third-place finish at New Smyrna Speedway, Gaulding parted ways with the team, joining Precision Performance Motorsports. Truck Series driver Daniel Hemric ran the car in the next two races, scoring a pole and two top ten finishes.

Car No. 24 history
In 2010, Brennan Newberry made his debut in the K&N Pro Series West for his father's team, running 3 races in the No. 39 Chevrolet with a best finish of 6th. Newberry ran a total of five K&N West races in 2011 between NTS's 29 and 39 cars, scoring two poles. He would make his K&N Pro Series East debut in the No. 29 car at Dover, finishing 25th. Jeff Oleen also ran two West Series races in the 39 car. Newberry would run two West Series races in 2012 and one in 2013 in the 29 car, while Dallas Montes ran three 2013 races for the team.

For 2014, Brennan Newberry ran the full 16-race K&N Pro Series East schedule in the No. 24 Qore-24 Impala, scoring one top 5 and four top ten finishes to finish 14th in points. Newberry also ran a single K&N West Series race, finishing second at Phoenix in February.

Car No. 33 history

After running the No. 33 in the K&N Pro Series East for Turner Scott Motorsports and Richard Childress Racing in 2014, Brandon Jones returned to the series for NTS in 2015, running select races in the No. 33 car beginning at Bristol.

ARCA Racing Series

Car No. 92 history
NTS made its ARCA Racing Series debut in 2012 with Brennan Newberry, driving the No. 92 Chevrolet Impala at Michigan and Kansas where he finished both races in the top 5.

NTS made its second season in the ARCA Racing Series with Newberry again driving the No. 92 Chevrolet Impala at Daytona, Talladega, and Pocono where he finished 6th, 11th and 4th.

NTS fielded the No. 92 Chevrolet Impala for Daniel Hemric at the season opener at Daytona International Speedway, where he finished 13th.

See also
 Kevin Harvick Incorporated
 Richard Childress Racing

References

Defunct NASCAR teams
ARCA Menards Series teams